Lisa Lodwick  (21 July 1988 – 3 November 2022) was an archaeologist who studied charred, mineralised and waterlogged macroscopic plant remains, and used carbon and nitrogen stable isotope analysis to understand the crop husbandry practices of the ancient Romans.

Lodwick's pioneering archaeobotanical studies at Calleva Atrebatum demonstrated the import and consumption of celery, coriander and olive in Insula IX prior to the Claudian Conquest. She jointly won the 2020 Book of the Year Award at the Archaeology Awards for Life and death in the countryside of Roman Britain.

She died on 3 November 2022, at the age of 34, from breast cancer.

Education and career 

Lodwick studied archaeology and anthropology at the Hertford College, University of Oxford. She graduated in 2009 and was awarded the Meyerstein Prize for best overall performance in the  School of Archaeology. In 2010 Lodwick completed a Master's Degree in European Archaeology, also at Hertford College.

Lodwick went on to receive a DPhil from the School of Archaeology in 2014. She held post-doctoral research positions at the University of Reading from 2014 to 2017 and later at All Souls College, Oxford. She was due to start a position as a Lecturer in Environmental Archaeology at the University of Cambridge in 2022.

Lodwick was elected a Fellow of the Society of Antiquaries of London in November 2018.

Research

Lowdwick co-authored the second and third books in the "New Visions of the Countryside of Roman Britain" monograph series published by the Society for the Promotion of Roman Studies. The third volume, Life and death in the countryside of Roman Britain, was written with Alexander Smith, Martyn Allen, Tom Brindle, Michael Fulford, and Anna Rohnbogner and won the Current Archaeology's 2020 Book of the Year Award.

An advocate of open access publication in archaeology, Lodwick was a co-founder and editor-in-chief of the Theoretical Roman Archaeology Journal, published by the Open Library of Humanities, and a member of the editorial board of the journal Britannia published by the Society for the Promotion of Roman Studies.

Select publications

References

External links
Interview with Lisa Lodwick on the Coffee & Circuses podcast

Place of birth missing
Alumni of Hertford College, Oxford
Fellows of the Society of Antiquaries of London
Fellows of All Souls College, Oxford
21st-century British archaeologists
British women archaeologists
2022 deaths
1988 births
Deaths from breast cancer